Methanizer is an appliance used in gas chromatography (GC), which allows the user to detect very low concentrations of carbon monoxide and carbon dioxide. It consists of a flame ionization detector, preceded by a hydrogenating reactor, which converts CO2 and CO into methane CH4. Methanizers contain a hydrogenation catalyst to achieve this conversion. Nickel is commonly used as the catalyst and there are alternatives available.

Chemistry 
On-line catalytic reduction of carbon monoxide to methane for detection by FID was described by Porter & Volman, who suggested that both carbon dioxide and carbon monoxide could also be converted to methane with the same nickel catalyst. This was confirmed by Johns & Thompson, who determined optimum operating parameters for each of the gases.

CO2 + 2H2   ↔   CH4 + O2

2CO + 4H2    ↔   2CH4 + O2

Typical design 
The catalyst traditionally consists of a 2% coating of Ni in the form of nickel nitrate deposited on a chromatographic packing material (e.g. Chromosorb G).

A 1½" long bed is packed around the bend of an 8"×1/8" SS U-tube. The tube is clamped in a block so that the ends protrude down into the column oven for connection between column or TCD outlet and FID base. Heat is provided by a pair of cartridge heaters and controlled by a temperature controller.

Hydrogen for the reduction can be provided either by adding it via a tee at the inlet to the catalyst (preferred), or by using hydrogen as carrier gas.

Start-up 
If the raw catalyst is supplied in the form of nickel oxide, it is necessary to reduce it to metallic nickel before it will operate properly. Alternative catalysts do not necessarily need a reduction treatment. Methanizers should not be heated without hydrogen being supplied to them.

Operating characteristics

Temperature 
Conversion of both CO and CO2 to CH4 starts at a catalyst temperature below 300°C, but the conversion is incomplete and peak tailing is evident. At around 340°C, conversion is complete, as indicated by area measurements, but some tailing limits the peak height. At 360-380°C, tailing is eliminated and there is little change in peak height up to 400°C. Operating temperatures for various methanizers range from 350-400°C.

Although carbonization of CO has been reported at temperatures above 350°, it is rather a rare phenomenon.

Range 
The conversion efficiency is essentially 100% from minimum detectable levels up to a flow of CO or CO2 at the detector of about g/s. These represent a detection limit of about 200 ppb and a maximum concentration of about 10% in a 0.5mL sample. Both values are dependent upon peak width.

Catalyst poisoning 
Nickel catalyst methanizers have been known to undergo deactivation with certain elements and compounds: 

 H2S. Very small amounts of H2S, SF6, and probably any other sulfur containing gases, cause immediate and complete deactivation of the catalyst. It is not possible to regenerate a poisoned catalyst that has been deactivated by sulfur, by treating with either oxygen or hydrogen. If sulfur containing gases are present in the sample, a switching valve should be used either to bypass the catalyst, or to back-flush the column to vent after elution of CO2.
 Air or O2. Reports of oxygen poisoning seem to be rather rumors than real facts. Small amounts of air through a catalyst will not kill it but anything over about 5 cc/min will cause an immediate and continual degradation of the catalyst. This has been seen first hand on several systems over 30 years of personal experience with a catalytic FID designed for analysis of U.S. EPA Method 25 and 25-C samples. 
 Unsaturated hydrocarbons. Samples of pure ethylene cause immediate, but partial, degradation of the catalyst, evidenced by slight tailing of CO and CO2 peaks. The effect of 2 or 3 samples might be tolerable, but since it is cumulative, such gases should be back-flushed or by-passed. Low concentrations do not cause any degradation. Samples of pure acetylene affect the catalyst much more severely than does ethylene. Low concentrations have no effect. Probably some carbonization with high concentrations of unsaturates occurs, resulting in the deposit of soot on the catalyst surface. It is likely that aromatics would have the same effect.
 Other compounds. Water has no effect on the catalyst, as well as various Freons and NH3. Here again, with NH3, there is conflicting evidence from some users, who have seen a degradation after several injections, but other researchers were not able to confirm it. As with sulfur containing gases, NH3 can be back-flushed to vent or by-passed if desired.

Troubleshooting 
In general, the catalyst works perfectly unless it is degraded by sample components, possible minute amounts of sulfur gases at otherwise undetectable levels. The effect is always the same — the CO and CO2 peaks start to tail. If only CO tails, it might well be a column effect, e.g., a Mol. Sieve 13X always causes slight tailing of CO. If the tailing is minimal, raising the catalyst temperature might provide enough improvement to permit further use.

With a newly packed nickel catalyst, tailing usually indicates that part of the catalyst bed is not hot enough. This can happen if the bed extends too far up the arms of the U-tube. Possibly a longer bed will improve the upper conversion limit, but if this is the aim, the packing must not extend beyond the confines of the heater block.

Catalyst preparation 
No catalyst preparation is required with a 3D printed jet.

For nickel catalyst methanizers:

Dissolve 1g of nickel nitrate Ni(NO3)2•6H2O in 4-5mL of methanol. Add 10g of Chromosorb G. A/W, 80-100 mesh. There should be just enough methanol to completely wet the support without excess. Mix the slurry, pour into a flat Pyrex pan and dry on a hot plate at about 80-90°C with occasional gentle shaking or mixing. When dry, heat in air at about 400°C to decompose the salt to NiO. Note that NO2 is emitted during baking — provide adequate ventilation. About an hour at 400°C, longer at lower temperatures, will be needed to complete the process. After baking, the material is dark gray, with no trace of the original green.

Pour the raw catalyst into both arms of an 8"×1/8" nickel U-tube, checking the depth in both with a wire. The final bed should extend 3/8" to 1/2" above the bottom of the U in both arms. Plug with glass wool and install in the injector block.

Disadvantages 
Traditional nickel catalyst methanizers are designed to only convert CO and CO2 to methane.  Due to this limitation, deactivation commonly occurs when other compounds are present in the sample matrix, such as olefins and sulfur containing compounds. Thus, the use of methanizers often requires complex valve systems that may include backflush and heartcutting. Nickel catalyst replacement and conditioning steps are time consuming and require operator skill to perform properly.

Alternatives

Jetanizer
An alternative methanizer design known as the Jetanizer, where the methanizer is fully contained in a 3D-printed FID jet with novel catalyst, is available from Activated Research Company. The Jetanizer utilizes the heater and hydrogen supply of the FID, reducing the need for additional fittings and temperature control. Similarly to the polyarc reactor, the Jetanizer is resilient to poisoning by compounds containing sulfur, halogens, nitrogen, oxygen, and others. A limitation includes its inability to convert compounds other than CO and CO2 to methane. Literature has been published in the American Chemical Society and the Journal of Separation Science explaining the industry changing benefits of the design which is approachable by any skill level of GC operator given its optimized and simplistic design.

Polyarc reactor

A post-column reactor that overcomes methanizer limitations is a two-step oxidation-reduction reactor that converts nearly all organic compounds to methane. This technique enables the accurate quantification of any number of compounds that contain carbon beyond just CO and CO2, including those with low sensitivity in the FID such as carbon disulfide (CS2), carbonyl sulfide (COS), hydrogen cyanide (HCN), formamide (CH3NO), formaldehyde (CH2O) and formic acid (CH2O2). In addition to increasing the sensitivity of the FID to particular compounds, the response factors of all species become equivalent to that of methane, thereby minimizing or eliminating the need for calibration curves and the standards they rely on. The reactor is available exclusively from Activated Research Company and is known as the Polyarc reactor.

References 

Gas chromatography
Catalysts